Inaya is a Bengali version of the Urdu name Inayat, meaning “care, concern.”

People
Inaya Day (born 1977), American singer
Inaya Ezzeddine, Lebanese politician and doctor
Inaya Folarin Iman (born 1996), British journalist, commentator and television presenter who presented for GB News.
Inaya Jaber (1958-2021), Lebanese writer, journalist, artist and singer

Notes